Harold John Warrender (15 November 1903 – 6 May 1953) was a British stage, film and television actor, and radio presenter.

His father was Sir George Warrender, 7th Baronet. His mother was Lady Ethel Maud Ashley Cooper, a singer and patron of music, and personal friend of the composer Edward Elgar and his wife Caroline Alice Roberts.

Warrender became well-known in the 1940s for his part in the popular radio variety show 'Merry-Go-Round' in which he conducted a cash quiz called 'Double or Quits.' The show started as a Forces entertainment which after the war continued in the BBC Light Programme.

Family
In 1942 Warrender married Constance Elizabeth Fowles, daughter of John Fowles vicar of Rye, Sussex. They had no children.

Filmography

References

External links
 

1903 births
1953 deaths
English male stage actors
English male film actors
English male television actors
Male actors from London
20th-century English male actors
Younger sons of baronets